The Type 093 submarine (NATO reporting name: Shang class) is a class of nuclear-powered attack submarines constructed by the People's Republic of China for the People's Liberation Army Navy.

Development
GlobalSecurity.org reports that development of the Type 093 began in the early 1980s. However, Admiral Liu Huaqing wrote in his memoirs that development began in 1994 following President Jiang Zemin's continued support for nuclear submarine development after the launch of the final Type 091 in 1990. Erickson and Goldstein suggest that the Yinhe incident in 1993, and continued tensions with Taiwan, also drove Jiang Zemin's support of the program. Russian experts aided the design.

The first Type 093 was laid down in 1994 and commissioned in 2006. The second was laid down in 2000 and commissioned in 2007. The first Type 093A was laid down in 2009 and was commissioned in 2015.

Variants
Type 093
Initial design. In the early 2000s, Chinese sources reported that the Type 093's noise level was on par with the improved Los Angeles-class submarines, and with Project 971 (NATO reporting name Akula) at 110 decibels. In 2009, USN ONI listed the Type 093 as being noisier than Project 671RTM (NATO reporting name Victor III) which entered service in 1979. Two built. NATO reporting name Shang I.
Type 093A
Modified design, possibly with greater length and a hump behind the sail. Four built. NATO reporting name Shang II.
Type 093B
Projected "guided-missile nuclear attack submarine" variant armed with surface/land-attack missiles.

Ships of class

See also
 People's Liberation Army Navy Submarine Force
 List of submarine classes in service
 Attack submarine

References

Citations

Sources 
 
 
 
 

Submarine classes